Boat Branch is a stream in Hickman County, Tennessee, in the United States.

History
Boat Branch was named from the fact flatboats were built and kept there.

See also
List of rivers of Tennessee

References

Rivers of Hickman County, Tennessee
Rivers of Tennessee